The Down Democrat was a weekly tabloid newspaper based in Downpatrick, County Down, Northern Ireland. It was published by Thomas Crosbie Holdings and then acquired by Alpha Newspaper Group.

References

External links
 Official website

Downpatrick
Mass media in County Down
Newspapers published in Northern Ireland
Thomas Crosbie Holdings